José María Bakero Escudero (born 11 February 1963) is a Spanish former professional footballer, and a manager. Having played mainly for Real Sociedad and Barcelona, he began his career as a forward (not being a prolific goalscorer) but was converted into an attacking midfielder, who possessed passing and scoring ability (with both his right foot and his head, the second despite his short stature) and great leadership skills.

During a 17-year professional career, he amassed La Liga totals of 483 games and 139 goals, winning a total of 17 titles. A Spanish international for seven years, he represented the nation in two World Cups and one European Championship.

Bakero began working as a manager in 1999.

Club career

Born in Goizueta, Navarre, Bakero made his senior debut with Real Sociedad on 6 September 1980 when only 17, coming from the bench in a 3–2 away loss against Valencia CF, and finished his debut season with 27 appearances but no goals. Appearing only in two games in 1981–82, he was however part of the Basque sides which won back-to-back La Liga titles, his teammates including Luis Arconada, Jesús María Satrústegui and Jesús María Zamora.

Bakero then signed for FC Barcelona, where he was joined by several other Real and Basque players: Txiki Begiristain, Luis López Rekarte, with Julio Salinas coming from Atlético Madrid but having also played with Athletic Bilbao, as another Real player, Jon Andoni Goikoetxea, joined two years later – they would form the backbone of the legendary Dream Team. Between 1988 and 1997 he (who scored 47 league goals in his first four years) played 329 matches overall for the Catalans, being instrumental in their league conquests from 1990 to 1994 and also appearing in the historic 1992 European Cup Final; in the latter tournament, as his team was trailing 3–0 at 1. FC Kaiserslautern in the second round after a 2–0 home win, his 90th-minute header secured qualification.

Having appeared scarcely during 1996–97, his last game coming on 18 November 1996 in a 6–1 home thrashing of Real Valladolid in which he scored, Bakero retired later that campaign after a small abroad stint with Mexico's C.D. Veracruz. He also had unsuccessful trials with Middlesbrough and Norwich City.

International career
Bakero earned 30 caps for Spain, netting on seven occasions. His debut came on 14 October 1987 during an UEFA Euro 1988 qualifier against Austria, replacing future Barcelona teammate Francisco Carrasco in a 2–0 home win.

Bakero would subsequently represent the nation at Euro 1988, as well as in two FIFA World Cup editions, 1990 and 1994.

Coaching career
Bakero moved into coaching after retiring in 1997, first as an assistant under both Lorenzo Serra Ferrer and Louis van Gaal. He also worked as a sports adviser with the Generalitat de Catalunya and, in 2004–05, had his first head coaching experience, joining Málaga CF's B side in January 2005 and helping them narrowly escape relegation from the second division.

In August 2005, Bakero was appointed director of football at Real Sociedad, and would be promoted to coach towards the end of 2005–06. Seven games into the following season, he was sacked.

In October 2007, Bakero joined Ronald Koeman's (another Barcelona teammate) coaching staff at Valencia, being dismissed in late April 2008. On 10 November 2009, more than a year after his last job, he signed with Polonia Warsaw, again as head coach. While the team was last in the league at that point, not only did he manage to prevent relegation but also led them to a win against city neighbours Legia Warsaw, the first in ten years. He was relieved of his duties on 13 September 2010, after suffering the first loss of the campaign.

Bakero signed with another club in the Ekstraklasa on 3 November 2010, now Lech Poznań. In his official debut, he led the side to a 3–1 victory over Manchester City in the group stage of the UEFA Europa League.

On 25 February 2012, following a 3–0 away loss to Ruch Chorzów, Bakero was fired. In 2013, he moved to South America to coach Juan Aurich from Peru, being dismissed in September of that year due to poor results.

In 2015, Venezuelan club Deportivo La Guaira hired Bakero as interim technical director, to help the new coaching staff by running training sessions. He returned to Barcelona on 10 July 2017, as head of the youth academy alongside former teammate Guillermo Amor.

Personal life
Bakero was the third of 11 children. His brothers Santiago and Jon were also footballers, and both forwards. After he joined Polonia as a coach he was accompanied, at his request, by Jon as an assistant.

Bakero's sister, Itziar, was also a footballer, who played at international level. His son, Jon, played college soccer in the United States for Wake Forest University, winning the Hermann Trophy in 2017.

Career statistics
Scores and results list Spain's goal tally first, score column indicates score after each Bakero goal.

Managerial statistics

Honours
Real Sociedad
La Liga: 1980–81, 1981–82
Copa del Rey: 1986–87
Supercopa de España: 1982

Barcelona
La Liga: 1990–91, 1991–92, 1992–93, 1993–94
Copa del Rey: 1989–90
Supercopa de España: 1991, 1992, 1994, 1996
European Cup: 1991–92
UEFA Cup Winners' Cup: 1988–89, 1996–97
UEFA Super Cup: 1992

See also
 List of FC Barcelona players (100+ appearances)
 List of La Liga players (400+ appearances)

References

External links

1963 births
Living people
People from Norte de Aralar
Spanish footballers
Footballers from Navarre
Association football midfielders
La Liga players
Real Sociedad footballers
FC Barcelona players
Liga MX players
C.D. Veracruz footballers
Spain youth international footballers
Spain under-21 international footballers
Spain under-23 international footballers
Spain international footballers
UEFA Euro 1988 players
1990 FIFA World Cup players
1994 FIFA World Cup players
Basque Country international footballers
Spanish beach soccer players
Spanish expatriate footballers
Expatriate footballers in Mexico
Spanish expatriate sportspeople in Mexico
Spanish football managers
La Liga managers
Segunda División managers
Real Sociedad managers
Liga MX managers
Club Puebla managers
Polonia Warsaw managers
Lech Poznań managers
Juan Aurich managers
Spanish expatriate football managers
Expatriate football managers in Mexico
Expatriate football managers in Poland
Expatriate football managers in Peru
Spanish expatriate sportspeople in Poland
Spanish expatriate sportspeople in Peru
Real Sociedad non-playing staff
FC Barcelona non-playing staff